This article serves as an index - as complete as possible - of all the honorific orders or similar decorations received by the Former Greek royal family, classified by continent, awarding country and recipient.

Greek Royal Family

:  Saints George and Constantine -  St. Olga & Sophia -  George I (defunct)

 Queen Anne-Marie:
 Grand Cross of the Royal Order of the Redeemer
 Grand Mistress Grand Cross of the Order of Saints Olga and Sophia
 Recipient of the Commemorative Badge of the Centenary of the Royal House of Greece
 Crown Prince Pavlos: 
 Grand Cross of the Royal Order of the Redeemer
 Grand Cross with Collar of the Order of Saints George and Constantine
 Officer of the Order of George I
 Officer of the Royal Order of the Phoenix
 Recipient of the Commemorative Badge of the Centenary of the Royal House of Greece
 Crown Princess Marie-Chantal: Grand Cross of the Order of Saints Olga and Sophia
 Prince Constantine-Alexios: Grand Cross of the Royal Order the Redeemer
 Princess Maria-Olympia: Grand Cross of the Order of Saints Olga and Sophia
 Princess Alexia: 
 Grand Cross of the Royal Order of the Redeemer
 Grand Cross of the Order of Saints Olga and Sophia
 Recipient of the Commemorative Badge of the Centenary of the Royal House of Greece
 Carlos Morales Quintana: Grand Cross of the Order of Saints George and Constantine
 Prince Nikolaos: 
 Officer of the Order of Saints George and Constantine
 Officer of the Order of George I
 Recipient of the Commemorative Badge of the Centenary of the Royal House of Greece
 Princess Tatiana: Grand Cross of the Order of Saints Olga and Sophia
 Princess Theodora: 
Grand Cross of the Order of Saints Olga and Sophia
 Recipient of the Commemorative Badge of the Centenary of the Royal House of Greece
 Prince Philippos: 
 Officer of the Order of Saints George and Constantine
 Grand Cross of the Order of George I
 Recipient of the Commemorative Badge of the Centenary of the Royal House of Greece
 Princess Nina:
Grand Cross of the Order of Saints Olga and Sophia
 Queen Sofía, Queen Mother of Spain:
 Grand Cross of the Order of Saints Olga and Sophia
 Recipient of the Commemorative Badge of the Centenary of the Royal House of Greece
 Princess Irene: 
 Grand Cross of the Order of Saints Olga and Sophia
 Recipient of the Commemorative Badge of the Centenary of the Royal House of Greece

European honours

Denmark 

 Queen Anne-Marie of Greece : Knight with Collar of the Order of the Elephant (1946–present)
 Pavlos, Crown Prince of Greece : Knight of the Order of the Elephant
 Queen Sofía, Queen Mother of Spain: Knight of the Order of the Elephant
  Princess Irene of Greece and Denmark : Knight of the Order of the Elephant
  Prince Michael of Greece and Denmark : Knight of the Order of the Elephant

Italy
 Princess Irene of Greece and Denmark : Knight Grand cross of the Order of Merit of the Italian Republic (27 November 1962)

Spain 
 Queen Sofía, Queen Mother of Spain:
 Dame Grand Cross with Collar of the Order of Charles III
11th Former Grand Mistress and 1,193rd Dame of the Order of Queen Maria Luisa

European dynastic honours

Two Sicilies 
 Queen Sofía, Queen Mother of Spain : Dame Grand Cross of Justice of the Sacred Military Constantinian Order of Saint George (1962–present)
 Princess Irene of Greece and Denmark : Dame Grand Cross of Justice of the Sacred Military Constantinian Order of Saint George (1962–present)

Asia honour

Thailand
 Princess Irene of Greece and Denmark : Dame Grand Cross of the Order of Chula Chom Klao (14 February 1963)

References

House of Glücksburg (Greece)
Greece
https://royalwatcherblog.com/2018/06/02/greek-royal-orders/